Crawford Lake is a lake in Rainy River District, Ontario, Canada.

References

Lakes of Rainy River District